Suzana Perović (born 16 August 1966) is a Serbian singer and television personality. Born in Belgrade, she debuted as a member the pop girl group Aska, with whom she released one studio album, titled Katastrofa (1984). Perović subsequently pursued a solo career as a folk singer and has released four albums.

She is arguably best known for her appearance in the 1987 sequel of the popular comedy film Tesna koža, where she performed songs "Zašto ljubomoran nisi" and "Princ iz bajke". Additionally, Perović competed on the reality shows Farma (2013) and Zadruga (2018-2019). She also hosted the Serbian version of the American series Cheaters.

From her marriage with business manager Vlada Perović she has a son and a daughter.

Discography
With Aska
 Katastrofa (1984)

Solo albums
 Opa, opa, sele (1986)
 Maštam o tebi (1987)
 Pobediće ljubav (1990)
 U meni neki vrag (1994)

Filmography

References

External links
 
 

1966 births
Living people
Singers from Belgrade
Serbian folk-pop singers
Serbian turbo-folk singers
Serbian folk singers
20th-century Serbian women singers
Yugoslav women singers
Serbian television personalities